Mordellistena okinawana is a species of beetle in the family Mordellidae. It was described in 1963. It occurs in Okinawa (Ryukyu Islands, Japan).

References

okinawana
Beetles of Asia
Insects of Japan
Endemic fauna of Japan
Endemic fauna of the Ryukyu Islands
Beetles described in 1963